Marko Grujić (born 13 April 1996) is a Serbian professional footballer who plays as a central midfielder for Portuguese Primeira Liga club Porto and the Serbia national team.

A native of Belgrade, Grujić started his career with his hometown club Red Star Belgrade, progressing through their youth system to the first team squad. He made his professional debut in 2013, and won the SuperLiga title in his final season with Red Star before completing a £5.1 million move to Liverpool. After five years with the Premier League club, he moved to Portuguese club Porto for just over £10 million in 2021. 

Grujić is a Serbian international, and represented Serbia at every youth level from under-16 upwards before making his full international debut in May 2016. He was part of the Serbian side which won the 2015 U-20 World Cup.

Club career

Red Star Belgrade
Grujić was born in Belgrade, FR Yugoslavia (now Serbia) and is a product of Red Star Belgrade, where he went through the youth program, passed all categories and was the captain of his generation. He made his professional debut for Red Star on 26 May 2013, in a Serbian SuperLiga match versus Vojvodina.

On 17 May 2015, Grujić signed a three-year contract with Red Star to last until 2018. Grujić scored his first senior goal on 26 September 2015 against Novi Pazar in a 2–0 victory; he also assisted Aleksandar Katai for the second goal. Grujić was a part of an unprecedented run of Red Star victories, as the club set a new record for the number of consecutive victories (19), ending the first half of the season without defeat.

Liverpool
Throughout autumn, Grujić was scouted by a number of high-profile European teams, including Liverpool, Internazionale, Juventus, Chelsea, and Milan. Liverpool manager Jürgen Klopp called Grujić personally to convince him to switch to Anfield, but initially Grujić's father was against his son moving to Liverpool. Klopp's assistant, Željko Buvač, flew to Belgrade to speak with Grujić and on 6 January 2016, it was confirmed that Grujić completed his move to Premier League side Liverpool, signing a five-year deal for a reported fee of £5.1 million. Upon joining, Grujić hailed Klopp for convincing him to join and told the press, "I would choose Liverpool over Real Madrid and Barcelona."

He was immediately loaned back to Red Star until the end of the season for a fee of £740,000, and won the SuperLiga with Red Star while on loan. Grujić finished the season with 29 appearances, 6 goals, 7 assists and was voted into the SuperLiga Team of the Year for his contribution to Red Star's unbeaten season.

On 20 August 2016, Grujić made his Premier League debut for Liverpool in a 2–0 loss against Burnley, coming on in the place of Adam Lallana in the 78th minute.

Loan to Cardiff City
On 17 January 2018, Grujić joined Championship side Cardiff City on loan for the remainder of the 2017–18 season. He made his debut for the club three days later, playing in a 0–0 draw with Sheffield Wednesday. Grujić's first goal for Cardiff came in a 2–1 home victory over Barnsley on 6 March 2018, scoring from range just after the start of the second half.

Loan to Hertha BSC
On 19 August 2018, Grujić joined Bundesliga club Hertha BSC on a one-year loan. He scored his first goal for the club on 8 December, netting the only goal in a 1–0 win over Eintracht Frankfurt. Hertha coach Pal Dardai hailed Grujić as "by far the best midfielder at Hertha Berlin in 20 years".

On 1 July 2019, his loan deal was extended for a second season, with a reported loan fee of £2 million.

Return to Liverpool
On 25 September 2020, Grujić started in the EFL Cup tie against Lincoln winning 7–2 and scored a goal, his first for the club.

Porto
On 6 October 2020, Grujić joined Portuguese club Porto on a season-long loan.

On 20 July 2021, Porto made his deal permanent for a transfer worth £10,5 million and a 10% sell-on clause.

International career
Grujić represented Serbia at all youth levels from under-16 to under-21, and was a member of the Serbia squad that won the 2015 FIFA U-20 World Cup in New Zealand.

In May 2016, Grujić made his full international debut for the Serbia national team after coming on in place of Nemanja Matić in a 2–1 win against Cyprus.

In May 2018, he was named in Serbia's preliminary squad for the 2018 FIFA World Cup in Russia.

In June 2018, he was selected in Serbia's squad for the 2018 World Cup, but he failed to make any appearances in the competition.

In November 2022, he was selected in Serbia's squad for the 2022 FIFA World Cup in Qatar. He played in a group stage match against Cameroon. Serbia finished fourth in the group.

Style of play
Standing at 6-foot-3-inches (1.91 m), Grujić has been described as "tall, rangy, comfortable on the ball and with a good range of passing" and dubbed the "new Matić" because of his likeness in both appearance and position to fellow Serbian defensive midfielder Nemanja Matić.

Career statistics

Club

International

Honours
Red Star Belgrade
Serbian SuperLiga: 2015–16

Liverpool
FA Community Shield runner-up: 2020

Porto
Primeira Liga: 2021–22
Taça de Portugal: 2021–22
Supertaça Cândido de Oliveira: 2020, 2022

Serbia U20
FIFA U-20 World Cup: 2015

Individual
Serbian SuperLiga Team of the Season: 2015–16

References

External links

Profile at the FC Porto website

1996 births
Living people
Footballers from Belgrade
Association football midfielders
Serbian footballers
Serbia international footballers
Serbia under-21 international footballers
Serbia youth international footballers
Serbian SuperLiga players
Premier League players
English Football League players
Bundesliga players
Primeira Liga players
Red Star Belgrade footballers
FK Kolubara players
Liverpool F.C. players
Cardiff City F.C. players
Hertha BSC players
FC Porto players
Serbian expatriate footballers
Serbian expatriate sportspeople in England
Serbian expatriate sportspeople in Germany
Serbian expatriate sportspeople in Portugal
Expatriate footballers in England
Expatriate footballers in Germany
Expatriate footballers in Portugal
2018 FIFA World Cup players
2022 FIFA World Cup players